South Of Hell is the third solo studio album by American underground rapper Boondox from Georgia. It was released on May 11, 2010 through Psychopathic Records accompanied by a DVD  documentary directed by Paul Andreson about Boondox's life and the making of the album titled Southern Bled. Produced entirely by Mike E. Clark, it features guest appearance from Insane Clown Posse.

The album debuted at No. 54 on the Billboard 200, No. 6 on the Top Rap Albums, No. 9 on the Independent Albums and No. 13 on the Tastemakers in the United States.

Production
Clark completed the album's music in his Fun House Studio in Sterling Heights, Michigan. Boondox felt more comfortable writing and recording the vocal tracks in seclusion, resulting in Clark moving the production to a cabin in the woods that he owned. Boondox wrote the lyrics by setting up large loudspeakers in the cabin and writing the lyrics while Clark played the unfinished tracks through the speakers. Clark describes this method of lyric writing as being "pretty scary [...] it definitely affected the music a lot".

Music and lyrics
According to producer Mike E. Clark, the lyrics were strongly influenced by the album's unusual production, and the seclusion of being in the cabin in the woods, describing the album as "music to get murdered by". The lyrics of South of Hell strongly derives from country music themes, touching on "love gone bad, family issues, and internal struggles with vice". The music combines elements of country with hip hop beats and funk-derived grooves, and includes live instrumentation, including slide guitar and banjos. "We All Fall" features the use of Auto-Tune. The title of the album, South of Hell, is a reference to the Slayer album South of Heaven.

Reception
Kik Axe Music reviewer James Zahn gave the album 3.5 out of 5, writing that "Boondox is at his best when keeping the south flowing throughout." Zahn describes "We All Fall" as the album's weakest track.

Track listing

Personnel
David "Boondox" Hutto – lyrics, lead and backing vocals
Joseph "Violent J" Bruce – vocals (track 14)
Joseph "Shaggy 2 Dope" Utsler – vocals (track 14)
Mike E. Clark – backing vocals, composer, producer, programming, recording, mixing
Jake "Cleetus" Polzin – backing vocals
Amanda Palmer – backing vocals
Jim Kissling – mastering
Paul Andreason – director

Charts

References

2010 albums
Boondox albums
Psychopathic Records albums
Albums produced by Mike E. Clark